Commission of National-Security and Foreign-Policy (of Islamic Parliament of I.R.Iran) is one of the specialty commissions of the Legislature of Iran which has a significant position in playing the role of parliamentary diplomacy.

"The Human Rights Committee", "the Foreign Policy Committee", "the Internal Security Committee" and "the Defense Committee" are the four committees that professionally are engaged in examination of the related matters in the area of authority of the National Security and Foreign Policy Commission.

Vahid Jalalzadeh as the head of the parliament's National Security Commission was elected by a majority vote of the commission's members on 21 June 2021.

Members 
This commission's members consists of: 
 Vahid Jalalzadeh
 Shahriyar Heidari
 Yaqub Rezazadeh
 Ebrahim Rezaei
 Ali Alizadeh 
 Seyyed Ahmad Ava'i
 Mojtaba Zonnour
 Jalil Rahimi Jahanabadi
 Abbas Moqtadaye Khurasgani
 Ali Aghazadeh Dafsari
 Mahmud Ahmadi Biqash
 Ruhollah Hazratpour
 Javad Karimi-Ghodousi
 Mohsen Pirhadi
 Mahdi Saadati Bishe Sari
 Mahmoud Abbaszadeh Meshkini
 Ebrahim Azizi
 Abolfazl Amuei
 Sara Falahi
 Abbas Golru
 Fada Hossein Maleki
 Hossein Noosh-Abadi
 Zohreh Elahian

See also 
 Specialized Commissions of the Parliament of Iran
 Joint Commission of the Islamic Consultative Assembly
 The history of the parliament in Iran
 Special Commission of the Parliament of Iran
 Islamic Consultative Assembly
 Majlis Research Center

References 

Committees of the Iranian Parliament
Islamic Consultative Assembly
Parliamentary committees